The year 1803 in archaeology involved minimal significant events.

Explorations
 First scientific expedition visits Tikal.

Excavations

Publications

Finds

Miscellaneous

Births
 7 May: John Howard Marsden, English archaeologist (d. 1870)
 31 December: Johann Carl Fuhlrott, German archaeologist (d. 1877)

Deaths

References

Archaeology
Archaeology by year
Archaeology
Archaeology